The church of the True Cross is a Roman Catholic church located in the San Marcos district of the city of Segovia, in the autonomous community of Castile and León, in Spain. Formerly known as the Church of Holy Sepulchre, it is located to the north of the city, very close to the convent of San Juan de la Cruz, on the slope that ascends to Zamarramala, a town of which it was, for centuries, a parish church.

It consists of a nave with a dodecagonal floor plan that surrounds a small central two-story shrine (edicule), to which apses and the tower were added. It is one of the best-preserved churches of this style in Europe. It was declared a Spanish Property of Cultural Interest on 4 July 1919.

History 
The construction of this temple has traditionally been attributed to the Knights Templars, but it is now believed that it was the Order of the Holy Sepulchre of Jerusalem that carried out its construction and that it depended, as an encomienda, of the Collegiate church of Santa María la Mayor in Zamora.

The temple was dedicated on 13 September 1208, as attested by the tombstone in front of the side door in the temple that narrates

In 1531 and as a result of the unification of the Order of the Holy Sepulchre with the Order of St. John of Jerusalem, it became dependent on the Sovereign Military and Hospitaller Order of St. John of Jerusalem, Rhodes and Malta.

To the original building was added an apse which is now used as a sacristy. Then, the tower, initially separated from the church, was added. Later, three apses were built, giving the church its today's appearance.

In 1692 it ceased to be a parish of Zamarramala and the Virgen de la Paz, whose image made of stone in Romanesque style, presides over one of the apses, became the patron of the church.

It was declared a Spanish Property of Cultural Interest by Royal Order on 4 July 1919. On 31 May 1951, the Sovereign Military Hospitaller Order of Saint John of Jerusalem, of Rhodes and of Malta took possession of it again and is in charge of its conservation and custody.

Arquitecture 

The temple was built in Romanesque style, already in transition to Gothic, with a dodecagonal nave surrounding a two-storey edicule, to which three apses, a semi-circular sacristy and a square-shaped tower have been added. A lantern stands out slightly from the roof and a tower attached to the building. The tower and a sacristy added to the south east of the church.

This type of construction, which has as its direct antecedent the Roman baptisteries of the early Christianity, was widely used by different Crusader Orders. It is estimated that the Dome of the Rock and the Basilica of the Holy Sepulchre in Jerusalem were taken as examples. The Templars, who had their headquarters in the Holy Land in the Dome of the Rock, built their churches in London, Paris (demolished) and Tomar using this type of layout, as did the Order of the Holy Sepulchre in Torres del Río in Navarre (Spain).

The exterior wall is made of ashlar, and it opens small semicircular arrow windows that give light to the temple. At the edges, buttresses reinforce the structure.

The tower has a square floor plan with a gable roof. It has four bodies and the last one, where the bells are housed, has two windows on each side with a semicircular arch. The base is reinforced with buttresses.

There are two doors leading to the church. The main one on the west façade, which coincides with the axis of the central apse, has a linteled opening with a plain tympanum and four archivolts decorated with serrated edges. On each side, three columns have sculpted capitals showing birds, warriors, human busts, demons, and bird sirens. On a roof with corbels, there is a window. The side door of the south façade is opposite the place where the dedication stone of the temple is located. It is made up of a semicircular arch and has no tympanum. Above it, on the outside, there is a relief depicting the Holy Women and the Angel of the Resurrection at the foot of the empty tomb of Jesus Christ. The archivolts are unornamented and the capitals are decorated with vegetal motifs, human figures and birds-sirens.

Interior 
In the walls of the nave remain vestiges of the old mural decoration as well as two niches, one with the icon of the patron saint of the Order of Malta, Our Lady of Philermo and another with the icon of the patron saint, St. John the Baptist. The flags of the Order of Malta, which refer to the languages into which it is divided, are located throughout the nave.

In the central apse there is an image of Jesus crucified from the 13th century. In the left apse is located the chapel of the tabernacle where there is a copy of the image of St. John the Baptist, patron saint of the Order of Malta, whose original is in its headquarters in Madrid. In the right apse is the Romanesque image of the Virgin of Peace.
The aedicula is a small two-story shrine located in the center of the church. It is accessed by a double staircase under which opens the access to the lower floor, facing the main door. The second floor is crowned by a caliphal dome and in the center there is an altar with Mudéjar decoration. The lower floor, with four pointed arches oriented with the cardinal points, has a ribbed vault.

The uses for these rooms are unknown. It is estimated that in the upper room, the arms sailing was carried out before the knights' crossings and in the lower room penitential acts were carried out. Today, religious celebrations of the Knights of the Order of Malta are organised on the upper floor.

Situated on the ground floor of the tower, a 16th-century niche carved in stone with the coats of arms of one of the Commanders of the Order of the Holy Sepulcher was built to venerate a relic of the True Cross. The relic of the cross is nowadays on display in the parish church of Zamarramala, where it was moved after several robbery attempts.

Situated on one of the walls of the circular nave is the Gothic altarpiece that adorned the central apse. It dates from 1516, from the Castilian school with scenes from the life of Christ.

Celebrations 
The Knights of the Order of Malta celebrate their religious celebrations in this church. The procession of Good Friday is noteworthy, especially the procession of the Lying Christ and the Lignum Crucis in which the Knights of the Order of Malta parade in black choir habits.

See also 

Monastery of Santa María del Parral

References

Further reading

External links 

Order of the Holy Sepulchre
Sovereign Military Order of Malta
Bienes de Interés Cultural
13th-century Roman Catholic church buildings in Spain
Romanesque architecture